Eutrachelus is a genus of straight-snouted weevils belonging to the family Brentidae.

Species include:
Eutrachelus morio Kleine, 1936
Eutrachelus temmincki (Latreille, 1825)

References 

 Sforzi, Alessandra, and Luca Bartolozzi, eds. 2004. Brentidae of the world (Coleoptera, Curculionoidea). Monographie del Museo Regionale di Scienze Naturali, Torino, no. 39. 976
 Biolib
 ITIS
 Universal Biological Indexer

Brentidae